This is a list of mayors of Wädenswil, a municipality in the Canton of Zürich, Switzerland. The mayor of Wädenswil (Stadtpräsident von Wädenswil) chairs the city council (Stadtrat). Before the town had city status, the term Gemeindepräsident was used for the mayor.

References

Wadenswil
 
Wädenswil